Brice House may refer to:

in the United States (by state)
Brice House (Annapolis, Maryland), listed on the NRHP in Maryland
Dr. Walter Brice House and Office, Winnsboro, South Carolina, listed on the NRHP in South Carolina 
Orlando Brice House, Eau Claire, Wisconsin, listed on the NRHP in Wisconsin

See also
Brice Apartments, Kalispell, MT, listed on the NRHP in Montana
Bryce House (disambiguation)